James R. Williams (1936 – 2020 in Columbus, Mississippi) was a U.S. lawyer, politician and jurist.

Williams received his undergraduate and Juris Doctor degree from University of Akron.

Williams supported gun control as an Akron, Ohio councilman.

In 1974, he was the Democratic Party candidate for Lieutenant Governor of Ohio.

Williams was the 25th General President of Alpha Phi Alpha fraternity. As president, he was named one of the 100 most influential Black Americans by Ebony magazine. Williams is also the principal founder of Akron-based the Alpha Phi Alpha Education Foundation and Alpha Phi Alpha Homes.

In 1978, President Jimmy Carter appointed him as the U.S. Attorney for the Northern District of Ohio.

Footnotes

References

1936 births
2020 deaths
Alpha Phi Alpha presidents
University of Akron alumni
People from Columbus, Mississippi
Politicians from Akron, Ohio
Ohio city council members
Ohio Democrats